Boente is a surname. It is the surname of:
Dana Boente, American attorney
Graciela Boente, Argentine mathematician
Alexis Boente, American news reporter for WVEA-TV
Bernd Boente, manager of Ukrainian boxer Wladimir Klitschko

See also
Boente, a parish in the Spanish municipality of Arzúa